Boronia quadrilata is a species of plant in the citrus family Rutaceae and is endemic to a small area in the Northern Territory, Australia. It is an erect, glabrous shrub with simple, sessile, wedge-shaped leaves, pale yellow petals and green sepals that are longer and wider than the petals. It is only known from a population of about fifteen plants.

Description
The plant is glabrous apart from the petals, which have star-like hairs, especially on their backs. The sepals and petals enlarge as the fruit develops.

Taxonomy and naming
Boronia quadrilata was first formally described in 1997 by Marco F. Duretto who published the description in Australian Systematic Botany.

Distribution and habitat
Boronia quadrilata grows in pockets of sand in sandstone outcrops and on scree slopes, in open woodland in the Magela Creek gorges to the east of Kakadu National Park. The total population consists of between ten and fifteen plants on a single ridge.

Conservation status
This boronia is classified as "vulnerable" under the Australian Government Environment Protection and Biodiversity Conservation Act 1999. The main threats to the species are its small population size, restricted distribution, and altered fire regimes.

References 

quadrilata
Flora of the Northern Territory
Plants described in 1997
Taxa named by Marco Duretto